Profiles in Folly is a historical book written by Alan Axelrod which is composed of many other true stories within the book itself, beginning with the Trojan War in "The Decision To Let Danger In", and ending with Hurricane Katrina in  "The Decision to Stop Short of Leadership". It is a follow-up book to Profiles in Audacity, and studies 35 of the worst mistakes in history. Each mistake is told in story form and is designed to teach the reader lessons through Axelrod's opinion.

Division of the book
The book is separated into six main parts, all focusing on different decisions leaders made in their actions of folly. These decisions are:

 The Decision to Gamble and Hope
 The Decision to Manipulate 
 The Decision to Leap (Without Looking)
 The Decision to Retreat
 The Decision to Destroy 
 and The Decision to Drift.

Within each of these decisions are short, historical stories such as "John F. Kennedy and the Bay of Pigs" under The Decision to Drift, or "The British Empire and Gandhi" under The Decision to Retreat. There are a total of thirty-five mini stories within the entire book.

The book focuses on mainly contemporary stories, but goes as far back as to the Trojan War (the very first story) under The Decision to Gamble and Hope.

See also
 Alan Axelrod
 Sterling Publishing

References

External links
Sterling Publishing website

2008 non-fiction books
21st-century history books
History books about politics
History books about the Trojan War
History books about the United States
History books about the British Empire
Sterling Publishing books